José María 'Txema' Añibarro Astondoa (born 26 July 1979) is a Spanish retired footballer who played as a defensive midfielder.

He spent most of his professional career with Eibar, after signing at the age of 29.

Club career
Born in Zeberio, Biscay, Añibarro played amateur football well into his 20s. In the summer of 2005, he joined Sestao River Club of Tercera División, and appeared in 32 matches in his debut season, which ended in promotion.

On 5 June 2008, Añibarro signed with Basque neighbours SD Eibar. He played his first match as a professional on 3 September, starting and being sent off in a 1–0 loss at CD Castellón in the second round of the Copa del Rey. He made his Segunda División debut on the 20th in the 0–0 home draw against RC Celta de Vigo, and scored his first league goal on 25 April of the following year, but in a 2–3 home defeat to Real Zaragoza.

Añibarro appeared in 25 matches in his first season, as the Armeros were relegated to the third tier. He remained a starter the following years, contributing 27 appearances in the promotion campaign of 2012–13.

On 25 June 2014, after Eibar's promotion to La Liga, 34-year-old Añibarro renewed his contract for a further year. He only made his debut in the competition on 16 January of the following year, coming on as a second half substitute for Borja Ekiza in a 1–1 away draw against Córdoba CF.

Añibarro announced his retirement on 17 June 2015, being immediately appointed coach at Athletic Bilbao's Cadete C team.

Club statistics

References

External links

1979 births
Living people
People from Arratia-Nerbioi
Sportspeople from Biscay
Spanish footballers
Footballers from the Basque Country (autonomous community)
Association football midfielders
La Liga players
Segunda División players
Segunda División B players
Tercera División players
SD Lemona footballers
Gernika Club footballers
Sestao River footballers
SD Eibar footballers
Athletic Bilbao non-playing staff